William Manning may refer to:
William Manning (author) (1747–1814), New England farmer, foot soldier and author of The Key of Libberty
William Manning (Unitarian) (c. 1630–1711), English ejected minister and Unitarian writer
William Manning (British politician) (1763–1835), British merchant and politician
William Montagu Manning (1811–1895), Australian politician
William Patrick Manning (1845–1915), Australian politician
Sir William Manning (colonial administrator) (1863–1932), British soldier and colonial administrator
William T. Manning (1866–1949), American Episcopal bishop
William Manning (bishop) (fl. 1945–1984), Anglican bishop in Africa
William Oke Manning (1879–1958), British aerospace engineer
William Manning (Australian politician) (1903–1986), member of the Legislative Assembly of Western Australia
Bill Manning, American sports executive, currently the President of Toronto FC and the Toronto Argonauts